Chełmsko Śląskie  is a village in the administrative district of Gmina Lubawka, within Kamienna Góra County, Lower Silesian Voivodeship, in south-western Poland, near the border with the Czech Republic. 

The village has a population of 1,900.

It is a former town. It was first mentioned in 1207 and was granted town rights as late as 1289, when it was part of medieval Poland. It remained a town until 1945. During World War II the Germans established and operated a branch of the Gross-Rosen concentration camp in the town. Chełmsko Śląskie contains numerous historic buildings and structures, the oldest dating back to the Middle Ages.

References

Further reading
 

Villages in Kamienna Góra County
Former populated places in Lower Silesian Voivodeship